Yên Mỹ is a rural district of Hưng Yên province in the Red River Delta region of Vietnam. As of 2003 the district had a population of 127,646. The district covers an area of 91 km². The district capital lies at Yên Mỹ.

References

Districts of Hưng Yên province